Gaziosmanpaşa Anatolian High School (or briefly GAL) is a 4-year Anatolian High School located in the European side of Istanbul, Turkey. The primary languages of instruction are Turkish and German. The secondary foreign language is English.

See also
 List of schools in Istanbul

High schools in Istanbul
1994 establishments in Turkey
Educational institutions established in 1994
Gaziosmanpaşa
Anatolian High Schools